Ouberg Pass (alternatively Oude Berg Pass, in part to distinguish it from Ouberg Pass in the Western Cape), is situated in the Eastern Cape province of South Africa, on the regional road R63, between Graaff-Reinet and Murraysburg.

Mountain passes of the Eastern Cape